St. Anthony's Catholic Church is a Roman Catholic church in Shenzhen, Guangdong, China.

History
The foundation of the church was laid in April 1998, and the church was completed in December 2001. Building the church took three years and eight months. The design of St. Anthony's Catholic Church aims to symbolize the spirit of Catholicism in the Shenzhen Special Economic Zone. The construction of the church required the efforts of a large number of Catholics.

St. Anthony's Catholic Church is an international parish, which each Sunday at 11:00am provides the Holy Mass in English for Catholics from overseas who live and work in Shenzhen.

Parish
The church has four Sunday Masses, at 9:00 am on Sunday, and 11:00 am on Sunday (English), and 7:30pm on Sunday(English), and 7:00 pm on Saturday. It also has weekday Masses  at 7:00am from Monday to Saturday.

Transportation
 Take subway Line 2 (Shekou Line) to get off at Qiaoxiang Station. Getting out from Exit A and walk  to reach the church.

List of bishops

References

External links

 

Roman Catholic churches in Guangdong
Churches in Shenzhen
Tourist attractions in Shenzhen
2001 establishments in China
21st-century Roman Catholic church buildings in China
Roman Catholic churches completed in 2001
Futian District